Acrocercops amurensis is a moth of the family Gracillariidae, known from Russia and China. The hostplant for the species is Quercus mongolica.

References

amurensis
Moths of Asia
Moths described in 1960